Leoncio Vidal y Caro (September 12, 1864 – March 23, 1896) was a Cuban revolutionary that fought in the Cuban War of Independence. A colonel, he fell in battle in Santa Clara, Cuba. He is considered a hero in Cuba and the Parque Vidal in Santa Clara was named in his honor. Vidal was the uncle of General Emilio Mola.

Early life
Born in Cuba to a Cuban mother, Marina del Rosario Caro Reyes, and a Spanish father, Leoncio Vidal Tapia, Vidal and his family lived through the calamities of the Ten Years' War in the town of Corralillo. Vidal's father enlisted in the Spanish forces against the Cuban rebels. However, the killing of a ten-year-old boy drove him to protest the war and move his family to Spain. The Vidal family lived ten years in Barcelona, the birthplace of Leoncio Vidal Tabia. There, Leoncio Vidal y Caro met his extended family, including their paternal grandfather whom awed Leoncio with his stories of resistance against Napoleon's invasion of Spain and the faith in and defense of the country.

Known as "the Cubans" while in Spain, Vidal and his brothers learned Catalan quickly. Always concerned for their education, Vidal's father sent the brothers to a school in Manresa. During this time, the Carlist Wars ravaged Northern Spain. The young and idealist Vidal brothers embraced the Carlist ideology, and fled the school and joined the guerrillas around Manresa. The chief of the guerrillas recognized the young boys, and ordered them back to school. Vidal, however, escaped and returned to the guerrillas, where he fought in battle and received a head wound. Vidal's father transferred Vidal and his brothers back to Barcelona, where they studied business, English, French, among other subjects.

Life
In 1878 the Ten Years' War ended, and the Vidal family returned to Cuba. Rather than return to Corralillo, they settled in Camajuaní, where there were lucrative business opportunities. There, the Vidal brothers grew very close, and became integrated in the social and cultural life of the Cuban town. They started a newspaper and spoke out against the exploitation of poor farmers. They also the modernization of the island, including the introduction of electricity, the creation of a firefighting corps, the construction of an aqueduct, and efforts to increase literacy.

Leoncio Vidal became involved early on in revolutionary activities. He attended secret meetings and discussions with other Cubans that would become revolutionaries. The Vidal brothers and the revolutionaries began printing the newspaper with revolutionary and progressive ideas. Vidal urged poor farmers to work with him to protest the unjust prices charged by middlemen. Vidal quietly looked for people with whom to collaborate, and created a secret army that spied and penetrated the Spanish ranks and created a network for trafficking medicine, weapons, and strategic information. Vidal collaborated with a telegraph worker to obtain the first electric dynamite detonator. He also gained the support of certain wealthy persons and maintained sources for medicine. Vidal's wife Rosa Caro and a group of women played an important role in smuggling medicine, ammunition, clothes, food, and information.

Vidal traveled the countryside looking for supporters for his cause under the pretext of planting cotton with success. When the War of Independence began in 1895, the great majority of the farmers joined him. With the rank of colonel, Vidal fought in many battles and skirmishes, including:

The attack of the fort in Santa Fe on October 30, 1895;
The attack of a train and looting of its goods on November 25, 1895;
The skirmish in Las Yaguas on December 21, 1895;
Led the guerrillas of Camajuani with machetes in San Lorenzo, capturing rifles, machetes, and horses on January 12, 1896;
The skirmish of Palo Prieto on February 8, 1896; and
The Battle of Santa Clara (not to be confused with the 1958 Battle of Santa Clara) on March 23, 1896.

Vidal led the only column of men to penetrate the city of Santa Clara and advance to the center of the city. He reached the city plaza, where Spanish riflemen shot and killed Vidal. The death of their colonel dealt a major blow to the rebels.

Today, Vidal is remembered as a hero of Cuba's independence. The central park of Santa Clara, Parque Vidal, is named in his honor.

Family

Vidal's brother was imprisoned by the Spaniards. He led a hunger strike, and died. Vidal's other brother emigrated to New York City. Vidal's sister married a Spanish Guardia Civil officer, who fought the Cuban rebels in Placetas, Cuba. Their son and Vidal's nephew, Emilio Mola Vidal, was born in Cuba, and left to Spain after Cuba achieved independence. He fought in the Spanish-Moroccan Wars, led the uprising against the Second Spanish Republic, sparking the Spanish Civil War. General of the Army of the North, he too would die in war.

Sources

1864 births
1896 deaths
People from Villa Clara Province
Cuban people of Catalan descent
Cuban revolutionaries